Rise is the third studio album by English singer and songwriter Gabrielle. It was released by Go! Beat Records on 18 October 1999 in the United Kingdom. A major commercial success, the album spent three weeks at number one on the UK Albums Chart, achieving 4× Platinum status. The title track also went to number one on the UK Singles Chart.

Track listing

Rise Underground 

Notes
 signifies a co-producer
 signifies an additional producer

Charts

Weekly charts

Year-end charts

Certifications

References

1999 albums
Gabrielle (singer) albums
Albums produced by Richard Stannard (songwriter)
Go! Discs albums